Wellsburg is a city in and the county seat of Brooke County, West Virginia, United States. The 2020 census recorded a population of 2,455. It is a part of the Weirton–Steubenville metropolitan area. The city's economy includes several telemarketing facilities, and a factory that does metal fabrication and plastics molding.

History

The town was laid out in 1790, and its post office was opened on September 1, 1870.

In 1772, the Cox brothers, Friend, Israel, and Jonathan, made tomahawk rights claims totaling  in the area now including Wellsburg. In March 1788, Charles Prather purchased  from the Cox heirs for $3,000. In 1791, Prather petitioned Ohio County to incorporate the town of Charlestown, Virginia, naming it after himself. The original name continued until 1816, when it was changed to Wellsburg, to avoid confusion with Charles Town, Jefferson County. The new name was in honor of Charles Wells (1745-1815), Charles Prather's son-in-law, builder of the first large flour warehouse in the east. Late in 1890, nearby Midway and Lazearville were annexed to Wellsburg.

Wellsburg was the home of Patrick Gass, the last surviving member of the Lewis and Clark expedition and author of a memoir of the famous journey. Here also was the home of Joseph Doddridge, author of Notes on the Settlement and Indian Wars. In 1832, the original Grimes Golden apple tree was found just east of Wellsburg. The first glass factory in Western Virginia was built at Wellsburg in 1813.

Wellsburg has a number of entries on the National Register of Historic Places.  The most notable are Miller's Tavern and Wellsburg Wharf.  The Wellsburg Historic District was listed in 1982.

Geography
Wellsburg is located at  (40.277370, -80.609349), along the Ohio River.

Demographics

2010 census
As of the census of 2010, there were 2,805 people, 1,312 households, and 767 families living in the city. The racial makeup of the city was 96.3% White, 1.9% African American, 0.1% Native American, 0.2% Asian, 0.4% from other races, and 1.1% from two or more races. Hispanic or Latino of any race were 1.2% of the population.

There were 1,312 households, of which 22.3% had children under the age of 18 living with them, 41.6% were married couples living together, 12.4% had a female householder with no husband present, 4.4% had a male householder with no wife present, and 41.5% were non-families. 35.9% of all households were made up of individuals, and 17.4% had someone living alone who was 65 years of age or older. The average household size was 2.14 and the average family size was 2.76.

The median age in the city was 48.3 years. 17.6% of residents were under the age of 18; 7.4% were between the ages of 18 and 24; 21.8% were from 25 to 44; 30.5% were from 45 to 64; and 22.7% were 65 years of age or older. The gender makeup of the city was 47.0% male and 53.0% female.

2000 census
As of the census of 2000, there were 2,891 people, 1,361 households, and 815 families living in the city. The population density was 3,104.0 people per square mile (1,200.2/km2). There were 1,493 housing units at an average density of 1,603.0 per square mile (619.8/km2). The racial makeup of the city was 96.68% White, 2.01% African American, 0.10% Native American, 0.10% Asian, 0.03% from other races, and 1.07% from two or more races. Hispanic or Latino of any race were 0.24% of the population.

There were 1,361 households, out of which 20.6% had children under the age of 18 living with them, 47.1% were married couples living together, 9.8% had a female householder with no husband present, and 40.1% were non-families. 37.0% of all households were made up of individuals, and 19.7% had someone living alone who was 65 years of age or older. The average household size was 2.12 and the average family size was 2.78.

In the city, the population was spread out, with 17.9% under the age of 18, 7.2% from 18 to 24, 23.3% from 25 to 44, 27.6% from 45 to 64, and 24.0% who were 65 years of age or older. The median age was 46 years. For every 100 females, there were 82.4 males. For every 100 females age 18 and over, there were 81.6 males.

The median income for a household in the city was $27,298, and the median income for a family was $36,750. Males had a median income of $29,808 versus $18,707 for females. The per capita income for the city was $18,498. About 11.4% of families and 14.6% of the population were below the poverty line, including 18.5% of those under age 18 and 9.5% of those age 65 or over.

Education
The county high school is Brooke High School, part of Brooke County Schools. Wellsburg has one primary school and one middle school, with the county's consolidated high school and Alternate Learning Center situated nearby. Brooke County Public Library is also located in Wellsburg.

Notable people
Russ Craft (1919–2009) - American football defensive back in the NFL
Glenn Davis (athlete) (1934-2009) - American Olympic Gold medalist hurdler and sprinter and American football wide receiver for Detroit Lions.
Philip Doddridge (1773–1832) - politician and advocate for western (now West) Virginia in Richmond and Washington, D.C.; Doddridge County named in his honor
Isaac H. Duval (1824–1902) - American Civil War General and Congressman 
Patrick Gass (1771–1870) - Member of the Lewis and Clark expedition
Maj. Gen. William Campbell Langfitt (1860–1934)
Joe Pettini (b. 1955) - Major League Baseball player, and coach for the St. Louis Cardinals

References

External links

 The Brooke County Review - Local newspaper

Cities in Brooke County, West Virginia
County seats in West Virginia
West Virginia populated places on the Ohio River
Cities in West Virginia